My Australian Roots is a 1989 album by Australian rude singer/comedian Kevin Bloody Wilson. The album was nominated for the ARIA Award for Best Comedy Release in 1990.

Track listing
All tracks written by Denis Bryant.

"You Orta' See Me (When I'm Pissed)" – 3:36
"Double Decker Dog" – 4:26
"The Great Roberto" – 5:05
"Me Dick's on the Dole" – 2:43
"The Featherbrain Championship" – 4:19
"The First Six Rows" – 3:35
"Ollie and Olga" – 3:11
"You Can Never Find One" – 2:35
"Flowers" – 3:05
"The Builder" – 3:18
"Amazing Grass" – 5:40

Charts

References

1989 albums
Kevin Bloody Wilson albums
1980s comedy albums